Indian lawyer. He served as the Chief of Judicial and Legal Affairs, and formerly the Head of Chambers, of the United Nations International Criminal Tribunal for Rwanda.

Prior to his current appointment, Ahmed was: 1) a rapporteur for the United Nations Mechanism for International Criminal Tribunals; 2) a Senior Assistant Prosecutor of the United Nations Assistance to the Khmer Rouge Tribunal; 3) a prosecuting attorney at the United Nations International Criminal Tribunal for the Former Yugoslavia; and 4) a Fellow at the International Court of Justice.

Ahmed graduated in law from the London School of Economics where he was a Chevening Scholar. He is a member of the Lincoln's Inn and an Advocate of the Supreme Court of India. He is currently a member of the Crimes Against Humanity Initiative Advisory Council, a project of the Whitney R. Harris World Law Institute at Washington University School of Law in St. Louis to establish the world’s first treaty on the prevention and punishment of crimes against humanity. He studied for a Bachelor of Technology from NIT Warangal and schooling from Kendriya Vidyalaya, Bairagarh (Bhopal).

References

Living people
Alumni of the London School of Economics
Khmer Rouge Tribunal prosecutors
Kendriya Vidyalaya alumni
Supreme Court of India lawyers
Year of birth missing (living people)